Harris v. Balk, 198 U.S. 215 (1905), was a United States Supreme Court case that exemplified the bizarre types of jurisdiction state courts (and therefore plaintiffs) could assert through quasi in rem actions before International Shoe's (1945) "minimum contacts" test replaced Pennoyer's (1878) principles of "power and notice".

This case involved three parties:  Harris, Balk, and Epstein.  Harris owed Balk money and Balk owed Epstein money. Thus, there was no debt relationship between Harris and Epstein. Harris and Balk lived in North Carolina while Epstein lived in Maryland. Harris traveled to Maryland. While he was there, Epstein attached the debt Harris owed Balk in order for Epstein to obtain jurisdiction over Balk. Through this, Epstein hoped to obtain the debt that Balk owed him by accessing the debt Harris owed Balk.  Consequently, Epstein obtained a judgment against Balk which directed Harris to pay Epstein instead of Balk.

To understand the principles in this case, one must understand a little about quasi in rem actions and jurisdictional principles at the time. At that time, a state court could not assert in personam jurisdiction over someone who was not physically served process in that state. However, if a defendant, on whom in personam jurisdiction was unable to be asserted, owned property in the state in which plaintiff was situated, plaintiff could "attach" to the action whatever property defendant owned in that state. Such an action was labeled quasi-in rem and, when this occurred, state courts were permitted to assert jurisdiction over an out-of-state defendant on any matter, with the limitation that any remedy be limited to involving only the attached property.

Applying the above principles to this case, debt (money owed to someone) is considered actual property of the creditor. Importantly, at the time of Harris v. Balk, debt was considered to "follow the debtor" (i.e., wherever a debtor went, he brought along the debt he owed to his creditor). When Harris entered Maryland, he "brought along" the debt he owed to Balk (Harris's debt to Balk being Balk's property). This enabled Epstein to attach it in a quasi-in rem action and obtain jurisdiction over Balk.

The principles allowing the Maryland state court to assert jurisdiction in this case were subsequently overturned by the Supreme Court case in Shaffer v. Heitner (1977).

See also
List of United States Supreme Court cases, volume 198
List of United States Supreme Court cases

References

External links
 
 

United States civil procedure case law
United States Supreme Court cases
United States Supreme Court cases of the Fuller Court
Overruled United States Supreme Court decisions
1905 in United States case law